Kanna Thorakkanum Saami is a 1986 Indian Tamil-language film directed by R.Govindraj for Punitha Cine Arts. The film stars Sivakumar and Jeevitha. It was released on 18 April 1986. The film was a remake of Telugu film Nenu Maa Aavida.

Plot 
Sekar (Sivakumar) arrives in Chennai to attend an interview and lands the job. Distant relatives Venu (Cho Ramaswamy) and his wife Usha, help him get settled. He rents a room at Sooru Subbamma's (Manorama) house by lying that he's married and that his wife will join him at the end of the month. Subbamma insists on seeing a photograph of his wife and also insists that he write letters to his wife. Sekar gets a picture of a random woman and sends letters to a fictitious address. He's in for a major shock when Sumathi (Jeevitha), his imagined wife, shows up at the house. Sumathi insists that she is Sekar's wife and he can't kick her out without Subbamma learning of his duplicity. Subbamma is also close to his boss so if she learns the truth, he would be out of a home and lose his job. Sumathi for her part insists that she is, in fact, his wife. She also knows so many details of his life that everyone around Sekar, including Venu who helped him in the initial duplicity, believes her. After some initial fighting, Sekar comes to see Sumathi's kindness and genuine affection for him. He falls in love with her and wishes to make their false marriage into a real one. However, Sumathi has many secrets and several enemies that threaten the couple's happiness. Sekar and Sumathi must confront these blockades to earn their happily ever after.

Cast 

Sivakumar as Sekar
Jeevitha as Sumathi
Cho Ramaswamy as Venu
Manorama as Sooru Subbamma
 Suryakanth
 K. K. Soundar
 Idichapuli Selvaraj
 S.Rajini
 A.R.Subramoniam [Mannankatti Subramoniam]
 G.Ramli
 Kovai Senthil
 Director V. Sekar (uncredited role)

Soundtrack 
The soundtrack was composed by Ilaiyaraaja and Gangai Amaran.

Reception 
Kalki called the film two hours of worthy entertainment.

References

External links 

1980 films
1980s Tamil-language films
1986 films
Films scored by Ilaiyaraaja
Films with screenplays by K. Bhagyaraj
Tamil remakes of Telugu films